FC Volga Nizhny Novgorod was a Russian football club from Nizhny Novgorod, founded in 1998. In 2008, FC Volga won the Ural-Povolzhye (Volga Region in Russian) zone of the Russian Second Division and advanced to the Russian First Division. In 2010 they promoted to the Russian Premier League. After the 2013–14 season, they were relegated to the second level once more. On 15 June 2016, the club was dissolved due to inability to service the accumulated debts.

History
The team was founded in 1963 after a merger of two teams from Gorky – Torpedo and Raketa. The team played in the Soviet Top League, where its best result was 14th place in 1964. The team was disbanded in 1984. In 1998, a new club called FC Elektronika Nizhny Novgorod was founded. It played in Russian Second Division. In 2004 it was renamed to Volga.

FC Torpedo-Viktoriya Nizhny Novgorod was another squad to claim the legacy of FC Volga Gorky.

League history

Russia
{|class="wikitable" style="text-align: center;"
|-bgcolor="#efefef"
! Season
! Div.
! Pos.
! Pl.
! W
! D
! L
! GS
! GA
! P
!Cup
!colspan=2|Europe
!Top Scorer (League)
|-
||1999||rowspan="2"|KFK(4th), "Povolzhye"||7||-||-||-||-||-||-||-||-||colspan="2"|-||align="left"|-
|-
||2000||bgcolor="lightgreen"|3||-||-||-||-||-||-||-||-||colspan="2"|-||align="left"|-
|-
||2001||rowspan="8"|3rd, "Ural-Povolzhye"||9||34||13||10||11||54||43||49||-||colspan="2"|-||align="left"| Kuznetsov – 12
|-
||2002||6||30||12||8||10||40||38||44||R256||colspan="2"|-||align="left"| Andrei Podolyanchik – 9
|-
||2003||14||38||11||5||22||41||62||38||R256||colspan="2"|-||align="left"| Andrei Podolyanchik – 14
|-
||2004||12||36||12||9||15||41||46||45||R512||colspan="2"|-||align="left"| Georgiev – 9
|-
||2005||6||36||15||12||9||44||30||57||R256||colspan="2"|-||align="left"| Udodov – 7
|-
||2006||7||24||10||8||6||31||23||38||R512||colspan="2"|-||align="left"| Loginov – 5
|-
||2007||4||26||15||5||6||52||30||50||R256||colspan="2"|-||align="left"| Kaynov – 11
|-
||2008||bgcolor="lightgreen"|1||34||23||9||2||73||23||78||R512||colspan="2"|-||align="left"| Prokofyev – 17
|-
||2009||rowspan="2"|2nd||4||38||17||14||7||54||32||65||R16||colspan="2"|-||align="left"| Khazov – 10
|-
||2010||bgcolor="lightgreen"|2||38||19||14||5||62||25||71||R64||colspan="2"|-||align="left"| Martsvaladze – 21
|-
||2011–12||rowspan="3"| 1st||14||44||12||5||27||37||60||41||SF||colspan="2"|-||align="left"| Bibilov – 7
|-
||2012–13||12||30||7||8||15||28||46||29||R32||colspan="2"|-||align="left"| Sapogov – 9
|-
||2013–14||bgcolor="red"|15||30||6||3||21||22||65||21||R32||colspan="2"|-||align="left"| Sarkisov,  Bibilov – 3
|-
||2014–15||rowspan="2"| 2nd||13||34||12||4||18||44||57||40||R64||colspan="2"|-||align="left"| Sarkisov – 12
|-
||2015–16||10||38||14||9||15||39||37||51|| R32 ||colspan="2"|-||align="left"|
|}

Farm club
No farm club

Notable players
Had international caps for their respective countries. Players whose name is listed in bold represented their countries while playing for Volga.

Russia
 Evgeni Aldonin
 Dmitri Bulykin
 Taras Burlak
 Andrei Karyaka
 Denis Kolodin
 Ilya Maksimov
 Dmitri Sychev
 Andrey Yeshchenko

 Europe
Bosnia and Herzegovina
 Petar Jelić
 Mersudin Ahmetović 
Israel
 Dani Bondar
Netherlands
 Romeo Castelen
Poland
 Marcin Kowalczyk
 Piotr Polczak
Romania
 Mihăiţă Pleşan
 Adrian Ropotan

South & Central America
Jamaica
 Luton Shelton

Former USSR countries 
 Artur Sarkisov
 Vagif Javadov
 Anton Putsila
 Igor Stasevich
 Gogita Gogua
 Gia Grigalava
 Gocha Khojava
 Otar Martsvaladze
 Giorgi Navalovski
 Edik Sadzhaya
 Lasha Salukvadze
 Mate Vatsadze
 Valerii Kichin
 Vitalie Bordian
 Simeon Bulgaru
 Sanzhar Tursunov

Managers

 Sergey Frantsev (2005)
 Sergei Petrenko (7 Dec 2007 – 5 June 2009)
 Sergei Perednya (interim) (5 June 2009 – 31 Dec 2009)
 Khazret Dyshekov (20 July 2009–09)
 Aleksandr Pobegalov (1 Jan 2010 – 7 May 2010)
 Omari Tetradze (8 May 2010 – 15 June 2011)
 Dmitri Cheryshev (16 June 2011 – 30 June 2012)
 Gadzhi Gadzhiev (1 July 2012 – 26 Dec 2012)
 Yuriy Kalitvintsev (19 Jan 2013 – 27 March 2014)
 Andrei Talalayev (29 March 2014 – 15 June 2016)

References

External links
Official website

 
Association football clubs established in 1963
Association football clubs disestablished in 2016
Defunct football clubs in Russia
Sport in Nizhny Novgorod
1963 establishments in Russia
2016 disestablishments in Russia
Soviet Top League clubs